MV Cape Taylor (T-AKR-113) is a roll-on/roll-off (RO/RO) ship with the Ready Reserve Force (RRF) of the
United States Department of Transportation's Maritime Administration (MARAD). , her homeport is the Port of Houston in Houston, Texas, and she is on ROS-5 status; she is able to be fully operational within 5 days of being activated. When activated, she becomes part of the United States Navy's Military Sealift Command (MSC).

Design and construction 

The vessel now known as Cape Taylor was laid down by Sasebo Heavy Industries in Sasebo, Japan in 1977. 
She is a conventional RO/RO (Vehicle Carrier) ship with the superstructure aft, followed by twin funnels, and a stern ramp. For carrying US Army and Marine Corps combat vehicles, she has  of cargo capacity. She can carry 340 containers plus vehicles and her hull is ice strengthened.

Service history

Commercial service 

US Government service 

Cape Taylor was purchased by the US Government in 1992 and acquired on 15 March 1993. On 19 August 1994, she was transferred to MARAD and became part of the Ready Reserve Fleet.

On 23 January 2003, Cape Taylor was activated and placed "In Service" from the Ready Reserve Force to haul military cargo to the Middle East in support of Operation Iraqi Freedom. On 6 June 2003, she was placed "Out of Service" and returned to her Ready Reserve Force lay berth in Houston on a four-day recall status. The Ship is Currently managed by Patriot Contract Services.

Footnotes 

Notes

Citations

References 

 Printed References 

 Online

External links 

 

1977 ships
Ships built by Sasebo Naval Arsenal
Transports of the United States Navy